Humanite may refer to:

Humanité, a 1999 film directed by Bruno Dumont about a detective investigating a girl's murder
L'Humanité, a communist affiliated newspaper based in Paris, France
Ultra-Humanite, a supervillain appearing in stories published by DC Comics